Alison Calder (born 21 December 1969) is a Canadian poet, literary critic and educator.

Life and career

Calder was born in London, England on 21 December 1969 and grew up in Saskatoon, Saskatchewan, Canada. She studied at the University of Saskatchewan, where she earned a BA, and at the University of Western Ontario where she earned an MA and a PhD in English Literature. She was also a Distinguished Junior Scholar in Residence at the Peter Wall Institute for Advanced Studies, University of British Columbia.

In 2004, she won the RBC Bronwen Wallace Award for Emerging Writers.

She wrote a collection of essays in 2005 called History, Literature, and the Writing of the Canadian Prairies which examines literary critism.

Her debut collection of poetry was called Wolf Tree and was published in 2007. It won the 2008 Aqua Books Lansdowne Prize for Poetry and the Eileen McTavish Sykes Award for Best First Book by a Manitoba Author at the 2008 Manitoba Book Awards. It was a finalist for the Pat Lowther Memorial Award and the Gerald Lampert Memorial Award. Her second collection, In the Tiger Park, was published in 2014 and was a finalist for the Lansdowne Prize for Poetry.

She also co-wrote the chapbook Ghost Works: Improvisations in Letters and Poems, with Jeanette Lynes.

She lives in Winnipeg, Manitoba and works at the University of Manitoba where she teaches literature and creative writing. She is married to writer Warren Cariou.

References

External links 
 Coteau Books Profile
 Winnipeg International Writers Festival Biography

1969 births
Canadian women poets
Living people
Chapbook writers
Academic staff of the University of Manitoba
Writers from Saskatoon
Writers from Winnipeg
21st-century Canadian poets
21st-century Canadian women writers
University of Saskatchewan alumni
University of Western Ontario alumni